My Father My Lord (lit. Summer Vacation) is a 2007 Israeli film directed by David Volach, a former Israeli Haredi.  It won the Founder's Award for Best Narrative Film at the Tribeca Film Festival.

Plot
Rabbi Avraham and his wife Esther have one son, Menachem, whose birth they regard as miraculous. Menachem's curiosity about the world is repeatedly stymied by his father, who in one instance forces him to rip up an "idolatrous" picture.  Foreshadowed by an instance of Shiluach haken, a trip to the Dead Sea — the eponymous "summer vacation" — ends with Menachem drowning and his parents mourning.

Cast
Assi Dayan – Rabbi Avraham 
Ilan Griff
Sharon HaCohen

Gallery 

Places that appear in the movie :

External links

 New York Times review of My Father My Lord

2000s Hebrew-language films
Israeli drama films
2007 films
Films about Orthodox and Hasidic Jews